The South African Amateur Championship is an annual amateur golf tournament in South Africa.

History 
The first tournament was held from September 26 - October 1, 1892. It was held at Kimberley Golf Club as part of the Kimberley Exhibition. It was entitled the "South African Championship." It was a match play event. Pat Grant was the favorite but was defeated by Denholm Walker in the early rounds. Walker ultimately won the championship, defeating H.J. Mackay 1 up in the finals. The second event was held at Port Elizabeth Golf Course and referred to as the SA Tournament. The format changed from match play to stroke play. D.G. Proudfoot won the tournament. It was his first of many victories in the event.

In recent years the event has usually been held in February.

Winners 

Source:

Proudfoot Trophy 
The Proudfoot Trophy was introduced in 1931. It was originally presented to he player with the best net score at the Inter-Centre Championship. However, it was later awarded to the medalist of the South African Amateur's qualifier.

Source:

Notes

References 

Golf tournaments in South Africa
Recurring sporting events established in 1892